Christoffer Gozzi (born May 8, 1993) is a Swedish ice hockey player. He made his Elitserien debut playing with AIK IF during the 2012–13 Elitserien season.

He is the son of Anders Gozzi and brother to Patric Gozzi.

References

External links

1993 births
Living people
Swedish ice hockey forwards
AIK IF players